This is a list of all the American golfers who have played in the Presidents Cup through 2022. Phil Mickelson holds the record number of appearances with 12.

Players

 + Selected or qualified for the team but withdrew and was replaced.
 * Playing captain

Playing record 
Source:

O = Overall, S = Singles matches, Fs = Foursome matches, Fb = Fourball matches
W = Matches won, L = Matches lost, H = Matches halved

Record American appearances

Record American point winners

See also 

Golf in the United States
List of International Presidents Cup golfers
List of American Ryder Cup golfers
Lists of golfers

References

External links
About.com golf Presidents Cup Records

 Presidents
Presidents Cup
Presidents Cup, American
Presidents
Golf
President